Duke Johnson is an American film director who specializes in stop-motion animation. He currently serves as a director and junior partner for Dino Stamatopoulos's animation production studio Starburns Industries in Burbank, California.

Early life
Johnson was raised in St. Louis, Missouri, where he attended St. John Vianney High School. Between his second and third years at St John Vianney, he attended a summer film course at Columbia College Chicago. He graduated from the film school at the Tisch School of the Arts at New York University, where he spent a semester studying animation in Prague. After graduating, he spent three years working as a waiter in a New York restaurant before moving to Los Angeles, where he obtained a Master of Fine Arts degree in directing from the AFI Conservatory in 2006. At AFI, he directed his student film Marrying God, for which he won 8 awards for best student film or best short film.

Career
Johnson has been nominated for Annie Awards in 2011 and 2012 for directing stop-motion episodes of shows such as Mary Shelley's Frankenhole and Community. 

In 2016, he was nominated for the Academy Award for Best Animated Feature in the 88th Academy Awards for co-directing the stop-motion comedy-drama film Anomalisa with Charlie Kaufman.

Johnson made his solo directing debut with the upcoming film The Actor, based on the 2010 novel Memory by Donald E. Westlake.

Filmography

Feature Film

Other credits

Television

References

External links 
 
 

Living people
1979 births
Film directors from California
AFI Conservatory alumni